Area 4 is the name of several places including:

 Area 4, Cambridge a neighborhood
 Area 4 (NTS) one of the named test areas at the Nevada Test site
 Area 4 (venue) and entertainment venue in Germany
 Brodmann area 4 an area of the brain
 Jiuquan Launch Area 4 or simply Launch Area 4
 Special Area No. 4, a special area in Alberta, Canada